Snikzwaag is a village in De Fryske Marren in the province of Friesland, the Netherlands. It had a population of around 65 in 2017.

History
The village was first mentioned in the 13th century Sneckswach, and means pointed (cattle) pasture. In 1840, Snikzwaag was home to 73 people.

Before 2014, Snikzwaag was part of the Skarsterlân municipality and before 1984 it was part of Haskerland.

Gallery

References

External links

De Fryske Marren
Populated places in Friesland